The 2022–23 Creighton Bluejays women's basketball team represents Creighton University in the 2022–23 NCAA Division I women's basketball season. The Bluejays, led by twenty-first year head coach Jim Flanery, play their home games at D. J. Sokol Arena and are members of the Big East Conference.

Previous season 

The Bluejays finished the season at 23–10 and 15–5 in Big East play to finish in third place. They lost in the quarterfinals of the Big East women's tournament to Seton Hall. They received an at-large bid to the NCAA Women's Tournament as a 10th seed in Greensboro region where they defeated 7th seed Colorado in the first round, upset 2nd seed Iowa in the second round to advance to their first sweet sixteen appearance. They upset 3rd seed Iowa State to advance to their first elite eight. They lost to the National Champion South Carolina.

Offseason

Departures

Recruiting
There were no recruiting classing class of 2022.

Roster

Schedule

|-
!colspan=9 style=| Exhibition

|-
!colspan=9 style=| Regular season

|-
!colspan=9 style=| Big East Women's Tournament

|-
!colspan=9 style=| NCAA Women's Tournament

Rankings

*The preseason and week 1 polls were the same.^Coaches did not release a week 2 poll.

See also
2022–23 Creighton Bluejays men's basketball team

References

Creighton Bluejays women's basketball seasons
Creighton
Creighton Bluejays
Creighton Bluejays
Creighton